1992–2012 The Anthology is a three-disc compilation album by Underworld, released 4 December 2011 on underworldlive.com for digital download. The physical CDs were released on 23 January 2012, along with A Collection, a single-disc compilation with radio edits. The first two discs contain a revamped version of 1992–2002, while the third disc of the collection contains an unreleased track from the band's early period, along with b-sides and other rarities.

1992–2012 is notable for including an extended version of "Jumbo", which was previously only available on a single Japanese promotional pressing of Underworld's previous greatest hits collection, 1992–2002. Unlike 1992–2002, this compilation's version of "Moaner" includes the fade out originally present on the soundtrack to Batman & Robin. Along with previous soundtrack contributions "Born Slippy .NUXX", "Dark & Long (Dark Train)" (both from Trainspotting, "Cowgirl" (Hackers), "8 Ball" (The Beach) and "Moaner" (Batman & Robin), this collection also includes "To Heal", which was used in the 2007 film Sunshine and was included on that film's soundtrack with excerpted dialogue as "Capa Meets the Sun (To Heal)".

Track listing

References

2011 greatest hits albums
Underworld (band) compilation albums
Cooking Vinyl compilation albums